Cellana karachiensis is a species of limpet, a marine gastropod mollusc in the family Nacellidae.

References

 Nakano T. & Ozawa T. (2007). Worldwide phylogeography of limpets of the order Patellogastropoda: molecular, morphological and paleontological evidence. Journal of Molluscan Studies 73(1): 79–99

Nacellidae
Gastropods described in 1930